The 2017–18 Marquette Golden Eagles men's basketball team represented Marquette University in the 2017–18 NCAA Division I men's basketball season. The Golden Eagles, led by fourth-year head coach Steve Wojciechowski, played their home games at the BMO Harris Bradley Center as members of the Big East Conference. They finished the season 21–14, 9–9 in Big East play to finish in a tie for sixth place. As the No. 7 seed in the Big East tournament, they defeated DePaul in the first round before losing to eventual tournament champion Villanova in the quarterfinals. They received an at-large bid to the National Invitation Tournament where they defeated Harvard in the first round and Oregon in the second round before losing to Penn State in the quarterfinals.

This season was the last for the men's team playing at the Bradley Center, as they will open the new Fiserv Forum for the 2018–19 season.

Previous season 
The Golden Eagles finished the 2016–17 season 19–12, 10–8 in Big East play to finish in a four-way tie for third place. As the No. 4 seed in the Big East tournament, they lost to Seton Hall in the quarterfinals. They received an at-large bid to the NCAA tournament as a No. 10 seed in the East region where they lost to No. 7 South Carolina in the First Round, who eventually won the East Region and made it to the Final Four.

Offseason

Departures

Incoming transfers

2017 recruiting class

2018 Recruiting class

Preseason
In a preseason poll of Big East coaches, the Eagles were picked to finish in seventh place in the Big East. Sophomore guard Markus Howard was named to the preseason All-Big East second team.

Roster

Schedule and results

|-
!colspan=9 style=| Exhibition

|-
!colspan=9 style=| Non-conference regular season

|-
!colspan=9 style=|Big East regular season

|-
!colspan=9 style=| Big East tournament

|-
!colspan=9 style=| NIT

References

Marquette Golden Eagles
Marquette Golden Eagles men's basketball seasons
Marquette
Marquette
Marquette